Hypocrisias is a genus of moths in the family Erebidae erected by George Hampson in 1901.

Species
Hypocrisias berthula Dyar, 1912
Hypocrisias fuscipennis (Burmeister, 1878)
Hypocrisias gemella Schaus, 1911
Hypocrisias lisoma Dyar, 1912
Hypocrisias lua (Dyar, 1910)
Hypocrisias minima (Neumoegen, 1883)
Hypocrisias punctatus (Druce, 1884)

References

External links

Phaegopterina
Moth genera